The Lynch School of Education and Human Development (Lynch School) is the professional school of education at Boston College.

Founded in 1952, the Lynch school offers graduate and undergraduate programs in education, psychology, and human development. U.S. News & World Report ranked the Lynch School as the #19 best school of education in the nation in 2020, lauding its programs in Curriculum and Instruction, Elementary Teacher Education, Secondary Teacher Education, and Student Counseling and Personnel Services.

History
Prior to World War II, Boston College's Department of Education within the College of Arts and Sciences was organized to prepare teachers, however student interest dropped after the war. Department chairman Charles F. Donovan, S.J., a 1933 graduate who received his Ph.D. from Yale, rearranged the curriculum and established a major in education. But changes in the field of education, including increased certification requirements for public school teachers in Massachusetts, made the need for a school of education apparent.

When it opened on September 22, 1952, the School of Education was Boston College's first coeducational school on the Chestnut Hill campus. Donovan as dean was assisted by Marie M. Gearan, who served as dean of women. In 1954, Campion Hall was designed by the Boston firm of Maginnis and Walsh, the primary architect for the university's campus. Archbishop Richard Cushing presided over a dedication ceremony on September 22, 1955. Charles Frank Smith Jr., Boston College’s first tenured black professor, taught at the Lynch School from 1968 to 1996. At one time beginning in 1973, an undergraduate final teaching practicum sent students during a semester to gain experience outside of Massachusetts, including Indian reservations, and to foreign countries. In 1999, philanthropists Carolyn and Peter Lynch, an alumnus and financial investor, donated more than $10 million to Boston College, then the largest individual gift ever made to the University. In honor of the gift, the School of Education was renamed in their honor.

Programs of study
The Lynch School offers Bachelor of Arts (B.A.) degrees in Elementary Education, Secondary Education, and Applied Psychology and Human Development; 17 Master's (M.Ed, M.A., M.S.) degree specialties along with several dual degree programs; and a Doctor of Education (Ed.D.) in Educational Leadership along with five Doctor of Philosophy (Ph.D.) programs in Curriculum and Instruction, Higher Education, Applied Developmental and Educational Psychology, Counseling Psychology and Measurement, Evaluation, Statistics, and Assessment. The school's M.A. in Mental Health Counseling is accredited by the Masters in Psychology and Counseling Accreditation Council (MPCAC). The school has over 60 full-time faculty members, more than 35 part-time faculty members and another 60 researchers, approximately 580 undergraduate students and 815 graduate students, and about 20 academic programs in education, human development, and psychology.

Research
There are several research groups operating within the Lynch School, and students often participate in collaborative projects. Major research projects are conducted under the auspices of the six major centers and institutes. Practicum sites are located in schools, clinics, and hospitals throughout greater Boston, especially in the Boston public schools. The Boston College Campus School, which serves about 50 multiply disabled children, can be used as a research and practicum site for students in teacher education programs. There are nine international practice teaching sites in American schools abroad.

The Journal of Teacher Education, Teaching Exceptional Children, the Journal for Educational Change, and the Journal of Technology, Learning, and Assessment are housed at the Lynch School. The Center for International Higher Education serves as a center of dialogue and communication among academic institutions in the industrialized nations and in the developing countries of the Third World and is home to the Journal of Higher Education in Africa, Educational Policy, and International Higher Education. The Center for Child, Family, and Community Partnerships engages in outreach scholarship in areas affecting the life chances of youth and their families. The Institute for the Study and Promotion of Race and Culture works to promote understanding of race and culture through psychological study and related psychoeducational interventions. The Center for Human Rights and International Justice offers a certificate in human rights/justice.

Notable faculty
 Andy Hargreaves, is the Thomas More Brennan Chair in Education. The mission of the chair is to promote social justice and connect theory and practice in education. Hargreaves's teaching and research at Boston College concentrates on sustainable leadership, professional learning communities, educational change and the emotions of teaching.

References

External links

Lynch School of Education and Human Development
Lynch School of Education and Human Development
Lynch School of Education and Human Development
1952 establishments in Massachusetts